The 1995 Purdue Boilermakers football team represented Purdue University as a member of the Big Ten Conference during the 1995 NCAA Division I-A football season. Led by fifth-year head coach Jim Colletto, the Boilermakers compiled an overall record of 4–6–1 with a mark of 2–5–1 in conference play, placing ninth in the Big Ten. Purdue played home games at Ross–Ade Stadium in West Lafayette, Indiana.

Schedule

Roster

Game summaries

West Virginia

Notre Dame

Michigan State

Ball State

Minnesota

Penn State

Ohio State

Wisconsin

Michigan

Northwestern

Indiana

References

Purdue
Purdue Boilermakers football seasons
Purdue Boilermakers football